is a passenger railway station in the city of Ōta, Gunma, Japan, operated by the private railway operator Tōbu Railway. It is numbered TI-52.

Lines

Station layout
The station consists of two opposed side platforms connected to the station building by a footbridge.

Platforms

Adjacent stations

History
Jiroenbashi Station opened on March 19, 1913.

From March 17, 2012, station numbering was introduced on all Tōbu lines, with Jiroenbashi Station becoming "TI-52".

Passenger statistics
In fiscal 2019, the station was used by an average of 544 passengers daily (boarding passengers only).

Surrounding area
 Godo Post Office

References

External links

 Tobu station information  
	

Tobu Kiryu Line
Stations of Tobu Railway
Railway stations in Gunma Prefecture
Railway stations in Japan opened in 1913
Ōta, Gunma